Poland competed at the 2020 Summer Olympics in Tokyo. Originally scheduled to take place from 24 July to 9 August 2020, the Games were postponed to 23 July to 8 August 2021, because of the COVID-19 pandemic. Since the nation's official debut in 1924, Polish athletes have appeared in every edition of the Summer Olympic Games, with the exception of the 1984 Summer Olympics in Los Angeles, because of the Soviet boycott.

Medalists

|style="text-align:left; width:78%; vertical-align:top;"|

|style="text-align:left; width:22%; vertical-align:top;"|

Competitors
The following is the list of number of competitors in the Games.

Archery

Two Polish archers directly qualified for their respective individual recurve events at the Games by reaching the quarterfinal stage and obtaining one of the seven available spots each at the 2021 Final Qualification Tournament in Paris, France.

Athletics

Polish athletes further achieved the entry standards, either by qualifying time or by world ranking, in the following track and field events (up to a maximum of 3 athletes in each event):

Track & road events
Men

Women

Mixed 

Field events
Men

Women

Combined events – Men's decathlon

Combined events – Women's heptathlon

Basketball

Summary

3x3 basketball

Men's tournament

Poland men's national 3x3 team qualified for the Olympics by securing a top three finish at the 2021 Olympic Qualifying Tournament.

Team roster

 Michael Hicks
 Paweł Pawłowski
 Szymon Rduch
 Przemysław Zamojski
Group play

Boxing

Poland entered four boxers (one man and three women) to compete in the following weight classes into the Olympic tournament. Damian Durkacz (men's featherweight) and 2015 European Games bronze medalist Sandra Drabik (women's flyweight) secured the spots on the Polish squad in their respective weight divisions, either by winning the round of 16 match, advancing to the semifinal match, or scoring a box-off triumph, at the 2020 European Qualification Tournament in London and Paris. Karolina Koszewska and Elżbieta Wójcik completed the nation's boxing lineup by topping the list of eligible boxers from Europe in the women's welterweight and women's middleweight division, respectively, of the IOC's Boxing Task Force Rankings.

Canoeing

Slalom
Polish canoeists qualified one boat for each of the following classes through the 2019 ICF Canoe Slalom World Championships in La Seu d'Urgell, Spain and the 2021 European Canoe Slalom Championships in Ivrea, Italy.

Sprint
Polish canoeists qualified six boats in each of the following distances for the Games through the 2019 ICF Canoe Sprint World Championships in Szeged, Hungary.

Men

Women

Qualification Legend: FA = Qualify to final A (medal); FB = Qualify to final B (non-medal)

Cycling

Road
Poland was eligible initially to enter a squad of five riders (three men and two women) to compete in their respective Olympic road races, by virtue of their top 50 national finish (for men) and top 22 (women) in the UCI World Ranking. Due to the reallocation of unused quotas, Poland was granted an additional spot in women's road race.

Track
Following the completion of the 2020 UCI Track Cycling World Championships, Polish riders accumulated spots for both men and women in team sprint, omnium, and madison, based on their country's results in the final UCI Olympic rankings. As a result of their place in the men's and women's team sprint, Poland won its right to enter two riders in both men's and women's sprint and men's and women's keirin.

Sprint

Team sprint

Qualification legend: FA=Gold medal final; FB=Bronze medal final

Keirin

Omnium

Madison

Mountain biking
Polish mountain bikers qualified for one men's and one women's quota place into the Olympic cross-country race, as a result of the nation's sixteenth-place finish for men and eleventh for women, respectively, in the UCI Olympic Ranking List of 16 May 2021.

Equestrian

Poland fielded a squad of three equestrian riders into the Olympic team eventing competition by securing an outright berth as the top-ranked nation at the International Equestrian Federation (FEI)-designated Olympic qualifier for Group C (Central and Eastern Europe) in Baborówko.

Eventing
Jan Kamiński and Jard have been named the traveling alternates. They replaced Paweł Spisak and Banderas as the latter was declared unfit to compete.

Fencing

Polish fencers qualified a full squad in the women's team épée at the Games by finishing among the top four nations in the FIE Olympic Team Rankings. Meanwhile, Martyna Jelińska claimed a spot in the women's foil by winning the final match at the European Zonal Qualifier in Madrid, Spain.

Golf

Poland entered one golfer into the Olympic tournament. Adrian Meronk (world no. 189) qualified directly among the top 60 eligible players for the men's event based on the IGF World Rankings of 20 June 2021.

Gymnastics

Artistic
Poland entered one artistic gymnast into the Olympic competition. The berth was awarded to the Polish female gymnast, who granted an invitation by FIG to compete in the all-around and apparatus events, as one of the twelve highest-ranked eligible individuals, not yet qualified, at the 2019 World Championships in Stuttgart, Germany.

Women

Judo
 
Poland qualified six judoka (two men and four women) for each of the following weight classes at the Games. Five of them, highlighted by Rio 2016 Olympian Maciej Sarnacki (men's heavyweight, +100 kg), were selected among the top 18 judoka of their respective weight classes based on the IJF World Ranking List of June 28, 2021, while Piotr Kuczera (men's half-middleweight, 90 kg) accepted a continental berth from Europe as the nation's top-ranked judoka outside of direct qualifying position.

Modern pentathlon
 
Polish athletes qualified for the following spots in the modern pentathlon at the Games. Łukasz Gutkowski secured his selection in the men's event by finishing thirty-eighth overall and fourth among those eligible for Olympic qualification at the 2019 European Championships in Bath, England. Sebastian Stasiak and Rio 2016 Olympian Anna Maliszewska secured more places each on the Polish squad by finishing among the top eight modern pentathletes of their respective individual events vying for qualification in the UIPM World Rankings of 14 June 2021.

Rowing

Poland qualified six boats for each of the following rowing classes into the Olympic regatta, with the majority of crews confirming Olympic places for their boats at the 2019 FISA World Championships in Ottensheim, Austria.

Men

Women

Qualification Legend: FA=Final A (medal); FB=Final B (non-medal); FC=Final C (non-medal); FD=Final D (non-medal); FE=Final E (non-medal); FF=Final F (non-medal); SA/B=Semifinals A/B; SC/D=Semifinals C/D; SE/F=Semifinals E/F; QF=Quarterfinals; R=Repechage

Sailing

Polish sailors qualified one boat in each of the following classes through the 2018 Sailing World Championships, the class-associated Worlds, and the continental regattas.

On 4 March 2020, Polish Yachting Association (PZZ) officially nominated the country's first ever 49erFX crew (Łoboda and Melzacka) to compete at the Enoshima regatta. Rio 2016 windsurfer Piotr Myszka, with London 2012 bronze medalist Zofia Noceti-Klepacka, going to her record fourth Games on the women's side, joined the sailing roster two weeks later. Meanwhile, Agnieszka Skrzypulec and Jolanta Ogar, who previously competed for Austria in Rio 2016, secured the women's 470 spot on their second trip together to the rescheduled Games, after being nominated to the Polish team on 11 June 2020. On 31 October 2020, Laser Radial sailor Magdalena Kwaśna was added to the Polish roster for the rescheduled Games based on her scores accumulated at various international regattas stipulated by PYA.

Men

Women

M = Medal race; EL = Eliminated – did not advance into the medal race; OCS = On Course Side – On the course side of the starting line at the starting signal and failed to start, or broke WS rules

Shooting

Polish shooters achieved quota places for the following events by virtue of their best finishes at the 2018 ISSF World Championships, the 2019 ISSF World Cup series, European Championships or Games, and European Qualifying Tournament, as long as they obtained a minimum qualifying score (MQS) by May 31, 2020.

Aneta Stankiewicz and Sandra Bernal earned a direct place each in the women's 10 m air rifle and women's trap, respectively, for the rescheduled Games as the highest-ranked shooter vying for qualification in the ISSF World Olympic Rankings of 6 June 2021.

Skateboarding

Poland entered one skateboarder to compete in the women's park into the Olympic tournament. With the cancellation of the 2021 World Park Championships, Amelia Brodka accepted an invitation from the World Skate, as one of the top-four skateboarders outside the World Rankings of June 30, 2021.

Sport climbing

Poland entered one sport climber into the Olympic tournament. Aleksandra Miroslaw qualified directly for the women's combined event, by advancing to the final stage and securing one of the seven provisional berths at the 2019 IFSC World Championships in Hachioji, Japan.

Swimming

Polish swimmers further achieved qualifying standards in the following events (up to a maximum of 2 swimmers in each event at the Olympic Qualifying Time (OQT), and potentially 1 at the Olympic Selection Time (OST)): To assure their selection to the Olympic team, swimmers must attain the Olympic qualifying cut in their respective individual pool events at various local and international meets approved by FINA between February 1 and May 31, 2021, including the Polish Championships in Lublin (April 30 to May 2).

Twenty-three swimmers (16 men and 7 women) were named to the Polish roster for the Olympics at the end of the federation's qualifying window, with sprint butterfly ace Paweł Korzeniowski racing in the pool at his fifth consecutive Games.

The team was reduced to seventeen swimmers (13 men and 4 women) before the Games because of various procedural errors by the Polish Swimming Federation. Alicja Tchórz, Bartosz Piszczorowicz, Aleksandra Polańska, Mateusz Chowaniec, Dominika Kossakowska and Jan Hołub arrived in Japan and were informed that they did not qualify for their respective events either through OQT or OST, prompting them to return home..

Men

Women

Mixed

Table tennis

Poland entered three athletes into the table tennis competition at the Games. The women's team secured a berth by advancing to the quarterfinal round of the 2020 World Olympic Qualification Event in Gondomar, Portugal, permitting a maximum of two starters to compete in the women's singles tournament.

Taekwondo

Poland entered two athletes into the taekwondo competition at the Games. With the Grand Slam winner already qualified through the WT Olympic Rankings, Aleksandra Kowalczuk secured a spot in the women's heavyweight category (+67 kg), as the next highest-ranked eligible taekwondo practitioner. Meanwhile, Patrycja Adamkiewicz scored a semifinal victory in the women's lightweight category (57 kg) to book the remaining spot on the Polish taekwondo squad at the 2021 European Qualification Tournament in Sofia, Bulgaria.

Tennis

Poland entered six tennis players (three men and three women) into the Olympic tournament. Hubert Hurkacz (world no. 17) qualified directly as one of the top 56 eligible players in the ATP World Rankings, with Kamil Majchrzak (world no. 112) receiving an additional spot after one of the original entrants withdrew from the men's singles.  Rio 2016 Olympian Magda Linette (world no. 44), and rookie Iga Świątek (world no. 9) did so for the women's singles based on their WTA World Rankings of June 13, 2021. Having been directly entered to the singles, Hurkacz and Linette opted to play with their partners Łukasz Kubot and Alicja Rosolska in the men's and women's doubles, respectively.

Volleyball

Beach

Men's tournament 

Two Polish men's beach volleyball pairs qualified directly for the Olympics by virtue of their nation's top 15 placement in the FIVB Olympic Rankings of 13 June 2021.

Indoor
Summary

Men's tournament

Poland men's volleyball team qualified for the Olympics by securing an outright berth as the highest-ranked nation for pool D at the Intercontinental Olympic Qualification Tournament in Gdańsk.

Team roster

Group play

Quarterfinal

Weightlifting

Poland entered three weightlifters (two men and one woman) into the Olympic competition. Rio 2016 Olympian Arkadiusz Michalski finished fifth of the eight entrants in the men's 109 kg category based on the IWF Absolute World Rankings, with Bartłomiej Adamus (men's 96 kg) and Joanna Łochowska (women's 55 kg) topping the field of weightlifters vying for qualification from Europe in their respective weight categories based on the IWF Absolute Continental Rankings.

Wrestling

Poland qualified six wrestlers for each of the following classes into the Olympic competition. Three of them finished among the top six to book Olympic spots in the men's Greco-Roman 97 kg and women's freestyle (53 and 57 kg) at the 2019 World Championships, while an additional license was awarded to the Polish wrestler, who progressed to the top two finals of the men's freestyle 65 kg at the 2021 World Qualification Tournament in Sofia, Bulgaria.

On December 19, 2019, United World Wrestling awarded an additional Olympic license to Poland in men's freestyle 74 kg, as a response to the doping violations on the French wrestler at the World Championships. On June 30, 2021, the Polish wrestling team accepted a spare license previously allocated by Sweden in the women's freestyle 68 kg, upgrading it to a total of six wrestlers.

Freestyle

Greco-Roman

References

Nations at the 2020 Summer Olympics
2020
2021 in Polish sport